Arkhangelskoye is a rural locality (a selo) in Shebekinsky District, Belgorod Oblast, Russia. The population was 623 as of 2010. There are 5 streets.

Geography 
Arkhangelskoye is located 13 km southwest of Shebekino (the district's administrative centre) by road. Novaya Tavolzhanka is the nearest rural locality.

References 

Rural localities in Shebekinsky District